Eva Bjørn Vedel Jensen (born 14 June 1951) is a Danish mathematician and statistician known for her work in spatial statistics, stereology, stochastic geometry, and medical imaging. She is a professor emeritus in the Department of Mathematical Sciences at Aarhus University.

Education and career
After earning a master's degree at Aarhus University in 1976, she became a faculty member at the university in 1979. She completed a doctorate at Aarhus in 1987, and became full professor there in 2003.

Recognition
Vedel Jensen has been an Elected Member of the International Statistical Institute since 1992, and is also a member of the Royal Danish Academy of Sciences and Letters.

She won the Villum Kann Rasmussen Annual Award for Technical and Scientific Research of the Villum Foundation in 2009. She was named a knight of the Order of the Dannebrog in 2010. The University of Bern gave her an honorary doctorate in 2013.

Selected publications
Vedel Jensen is the author of books including:
Local Stereology (World Scientific, 1998)
Stereology for Statisticians (with Adrian Baddeley, Chapman & Hall/CRC, 2005)

She has also written several highly cited papers with Hans Jørgen G. Gundersen including:

References

External links

Living people
Danish mathematicians
Danish statisticians
Danish women mathematicians
Women statisticians
Aarhus University alumni
Academic staff of Aarhus University
Elected Members of the International Statistical Institute
Knights of the Order of the Dannebrog
Members of the Royal Danish Academy of Sciences and Letters
1951 births
Spatial statisticians